The 2010 ICC Under-19 Cricket World Cup was the eighth edition of the Under-19 Cricket World Cup and took place in New Zealand. Since 1998, the tournament has been held every 2 years. This edition had 16 teams competing in 44 matches between 15 and 30 January 2010. These included the 10 ICC Full Members and 6 Qualifiers. The tournament was originally scheduled to take place in Kenya, but the International Cricket Council (ICC) moved it to New Zealand after an inspection in June 2009 found that it would be unrealistic to expect Kenya to complete preparations in time.

Australia won the tournament, beating Pakistan in the final by 25 runs. South African Dominic Hendricks scored the most runs in the tournament, and Raymond Haoda of Papua New Guinea claimed the most wickets.

Venues
The following venues were used for the tournament:

Teams

16 teams participated in the competition. The 10 nations with ICC Full Membership automatically qualified for the tournament. 6 additional teams were determined by the 2009 Under-19 Cricket World Cup Qualifier.

Groups
The following groups were chosen for the World Cup 2010 by the International Cricket Council. The number alongside gives the rank of the team. The tournament will begin with a league stage consisting of four groups of four. Each team will play each of the other teams in its group once.

Squads

Each country selected a 15-man squad for the tournament.

Group stage
 All matches to start at 10.30 (NZ Local)
 New Zealand local Time is GMT+13
 The top 2 teams from each group qualified for the knock-out rounds of the tournament.
 The bottom 2 teams from each group take part in a Plate competition knock-out.

Group A

Group B

Group C

Group D

Knock-out stages

Quarter-finals

Super quarter-finals

Plate quarter-finals

Semi-finals

Super semi-finals

5th place semi-finals

Plate semi-finals

13th place semi-finals

Play-off finals

15th place play-off

13th place play-off

11th place play-off

Plate final

7th place play-off

5th place play-off

3rd place play-off

Final

Final standings

Media coverage
 Supersport (live) – South Africa
 STAR Cricket (live) – India
 SKY Sport (live) – New Zealand
 GEO Super (live) – Pakistan
 PTV Home (live) – Pakistan
 Fox Sports (live) – Australia
 Sky Sports (live) – United Kingdom
 ART Prime Sports (live) – Middle East

References

External links
Official website of U-19 World Cup
ICC U-19 Cricket World Cup 2010 Schedule
About the ICC U-19 Cricket World Cup 2010
Fixtures

ICC Under-19 Cricket World Cup
Under-19 Cricket World Cup
2010 in New Zealand sport
International cricket competitions in New Zealand
2010 ICC Under-19 Cricket World Cup